Bassima Hakkaoui ( - born 5 October 1960, Casablanca) is a Moroccan politician of the Justice and Development Party. Since 3 January 2012, she has held the position of Minister of Solidarity, Women, Family and Social Development in Abdelilah Benkirane's cabinet. She has been a member of the House of Representatives since 2002, having been elected from the national list reserved for women. She was re-elected in 2007 and 2011. In 2018 a law went into effect throughout Morocco known as the Hakkaoui law because she drafted it; the law includes a ban on forced marriage and sexual harassment in public places, and harsher penalties for certain forms of violence. But it was criticized for requiring victims to file for criminal prosecution to get protection.

See also
Cabinet of Morocco
Justice and Development Party

References

External links
Ministry of Solidarity and Social Development

Living people
Government ministers of Morocco
1960 births
People from Casablanca
Justice and Development Party (Morocco) politicians